The church of San Luigi Maria Grignion de Montfort is a church in Rome, in the Primavalle district, on Avenue of the Montfort, dedicated to Saint Louis-Marie Grignion de Montfort (1673–1716).

History
It was designed by architect Francesco Romanelli, in the late sixties of the twentieth century and consecrated by the Cardinal Vicar Angelo Dell'Acqua on June 30, 1970.

The church is home parish, erected on September 24 in 1962 with the decree of the Cardinal Vicar Clemente Micara Cum in suburban, and entrusted to the priests of the Company of Mary (called Montfort). It is home to the cardinal's title of "St. Louis Grignon de Montfort",  instituted by Pope John Paul II.

List of Cardinal Protectors
 Robert Coffy (28 June 1991 - 15 July 1995)
 Serafim Fernandes de Araujo (25 February 1998 – 8 October 2019)
 Felipe Arizmendi Esquivel (28 November 2020 – present)

References

External links
 San Luigi Maria

Titular churches
Rome Q. XXVII Primavalle
20th-century Roman Catholic church buildings in Italy